Harvey Gaylord (July 1, 1904 - May 20, 1983) was president of the Bell Aerospace Corporation and an executive vice president of Textron Inc. He died at Lawrence and Memorial Hospitals in New London, Connecticut. He was a resident of Niantic, Connecticut, and was 78 years old.

Gaylord joined Bell in 1941. During the Second World War he was involved in the management of the B-29 plant in Marietta, Georgia. In 1959 he was elected president of Bell Aerospace Corporation. He was also involved in the licensing of Bell Helicopter production to Agusta in Italy. He then was named president of the Bell Aerospace Corporation, now Bell Helicopter Textron when it became a wholly owned subsidiary of Textron. He was named executive vice president of Textron in 1963 and also served as president of the National Aviation Corporation until he retired in 1971.  During his tenure at Bell, he shepherded the development of many famous experimental aircraft, including the X1, as well as successful commercial and military helicopters including the CH-139 Jet Ranger, Huey, and AH-1 Cobra.

He was born in Buffalo and graduated from Princeton University in 1927. Prior to work at Bell, he worked as a stockbroker in New York City and Buffalo, New York. He was a director of the American Helicopter Society and the National Security Industrial Association and also served from 1957 to 1959 as secretary of the Army Scientific Advisory Panel. His work on this panel advocated the expanded use of helicopters in military operations.

Gaylord was the son of Dr. Harvey Russell Gaylord, a pioneer cancer researcher in Buffalo New York, and the grandson of Augustine S. Gaylord, United States Attorney under Ulysses S. Grant. Augustine Gaylord was the son of the first Harvey Russell Gaylord, a prominent abolitionist in Ashtabula County, Ohio. His interests included sports cars—including an Arnolt Bristol, and wine. He was a member of the Confrérie des Chevaliers du Tastevin.

Sources
 New York Times Obit Published: May 25, 1983 
 Gaylord family history

1904 births
1983 deaths